Montagnea is a genus of fungi in the family Agaricaceae. The genus has a widespread distribution in subtropical dry areas, and contains six species. Montagnea was circumscribed by Swedish mycologist Elias Magnus Fries in 1836.

The genus name of Montagnea is in honour of Jean Pierre François Camille Montagne (1784–1866), who was a French military physician and botanist who specialized in the fields of bryology and mycology.

Species
As accepted by GBIF;
 Montagnea arenaria  
 Montagnea argentina 
 Montagnea candollei 
 Montagnea psamathonophila 
 Montagnea radiosa 
 ''Montagnea tenuis

See also
List of Agaricaceae genera
List of Agaricales genera

References

Agaricaceae
Agaricales genera